BrowserQuest was a free massively multiplayer online role-playing game created by French developer Little Workshop and the Mozilla Foundation. The official website is currently defunct, attributed to lack of resources.

Technology
BrowserQuest is a demonstration of a number of modern web technologies. It is written in HTML5, utilizing WebSockets for multiplayer networking, and is playable from modern web browsers. The client makes use of HTML5's canvas element to render the graphics, web workers to initialize the map without affecting the rest of the page, localStorage to save progress, media queries to dynamically resize the game to the device, and HTML5 Audio to render the sound. The server is written in JavaScript, and runs in Node.js. The server and browser communicate using WebSockets.

Both BrowserQuest's client and server source code are available on GitHub. Its code is licensed under MPL 2.0. Content is licensed under CC BY-SA 3.0.

Gameplay
In BrowserQuest, players can interact with each other using the in-game chat system, or by working together to defeat enemies. There are achievements available to unlock as one plays. Loot is dropped when players defeat the enemies, which can be picked up by any player. Loot includes the invincibility potion, which changes a player's outfit to appear like the Firefox logo, and various gear. At one point in time, the system recorded over 1,900 concurrent users playing at the same time.

References

External links 

Original BrowserQuest source code dump repository on GitHub

Mozilla
Massively multiplayer online role-playing games